The National Anthropological Archives is a collection of historical and contemporary documents maintained by the Smithsonian Institution, which document the history of anthropology and the world's peoples and cultures. It is located in the Smithsonian's Museum Support Center in Suitland, Maryland, and is part of the Department of Anthropology at the National Museum of Natural History.

History
The National Anthropological Archives (NAA) is the successor to the archives of the Bureau of American Ethnology (BAE), which was founded in 1879 by John Wesley Powell. In 1968, The NAA was established, incorporating the collections of the BAE, which focused on American Indians, as well as the papers of curators in the National Museum of Natural History's Department of Anthropology, who conducted research around the world. The establishment of the NAA was supported by grants from the Wenner-Gren Foundation with the aim of providing a repository of record for personal research materials created by scholars without a home institution (or whose home institution had no archives), in order to promote the preservation of the anthropological record.

Collections
The NAA is the only archival repository in the United States dedicated exclusively to preserving ethnographic, archaeological, and linguistic fieldnotes, physical anthropological data, photographs, sound recordings and other media created by American anthropologists. The collection includes documents such as fieldnotes, journals, manuscripts, correspondence, photographs, maps, sound recordings, all compiled by prominent researchers from the Smithsonian or other research institutions. Spanning over 150 years of American history and world history, materials held in the archives include nearly 635,000 photographs, 20,000 works of indigenous art, and 11,400 sound recordings.

In 2010, the NAA received a Save America's Treasures grant to preserve manuscripts relating to endangered languages. These manuscripts include vocabularies, narratives, and other texts representing approximately 250 American Indian languages. Many photographs and manuscript pages from the NAA collections, including 8,200 pages of Cherokee language materials, have been scanned and are available online for research through SIRIS, the Smithsonian's online catalog. In 2014, the NAA received a grant for preservation and digitization of sound recordings of endangered languages.

See also
Human Studies Film Archives

References

External links

National Anthropological Archives and Human Studies Film Archives on the Anthropology Collections and Archives page at the National Museum of Natural History
National Anthropological Archives Collections on Smithsonian's Collections Search Center
National Anthropological Archives Collections on Smithsonian's Online Virtual Archives
Department of Anthropology, National Museum of Natural History, Smithsonian Institution

Archives in the United States
Smithsonian Institution research programs
1965 establishments in the United States
Research institutes in Maryland